William Elmer Jacobs (August 10, 1892 – February 10, 1958) was a pitcher in Major League Baseball from 1914 to 1927. He played for the Philadelphia Phillies, Pittsburgh Pirates, St. Louis Cardinals, Chicago Cubs, and Chicago White Sox. Jacobs' key pitch was the curveball. In 1926, he was suspended for 10 days after being caught with foreign substances on the mound.

References

External links

1892 births
1958 deaths
Major League Baseball pitchers
Philadelphia Phillies players
Pittsburgh Pirates players
St. Louis Cardinals players
Chicago Cubs players
Chicago White Sox players
Baseball players from Missouri
Clinton Champs players
Kankakee Kanks players
Albany Senators players
Seattle Rainiers players
Seattle Indians players
Los Angeles Angels (minor league) players
San Francisco Seals (baseball) players
Memphis Chickasaws players
Knoxville Smokies players
People from Salem, Missouri